Udinese Calcio had its best season since the days of Zico in the club during the 1980s. With goal scoring trio Oliver Bierhoff, Márcio Amoroso and Paolo Poggi on top form, Udinese finished fifth, even troubling the top three in the standings. Bierhoff and Poggi scored 13 goals each, while Amoroso hit the back of the net on 12 occasions. Despite the sensational results, coach Alberto Zaccheroni remained at the small club, while 1997–98 looked set to become a further improvement for Udinese.

Players

First-team squad

Transfers

Winter

Results

Serie A

League table

Position by round

Matches

Coppa Italia

Second round

Statistics

Players statistics

Top scorers
  Oliver Bierhoff 13
  Paolo Poggi 13
  Márcio Amoroso 12
  Giovanni Bia 4
  Massimiliano Cappioli 3

References

Sources
  RSSSF – Italy 1996/97

Udinese Calcio seasons
Udinese